Javid James (born April 17, 1986) is a former professional American and Canadian football wide receiver who is currently a free agent. He was signed by the Montreal Alouettes as a street free agent in 2008. He played college football for the UCF Knights.

Education
James went to Edna Karr Magnet High School and after he graduated went to West Hills. He later attended the University of Central Florida.

Family
James is the son of Erine James.

References

External links
Montreal Alouettes bio

1986 births
Living people
Players of American football from New Orleans
Players of Canadian football from New Orleans
American players of Canadian football
Canadian football wide receivers
American football wide receivers
UCF Knights football players
Montreal Alouettes players